Laak can refer to:

People

Laak
 Aleksander Laak (1907–1960), lieutenant and the commander of the Jägala concentration camp during the German occupation
 Dan Laak, American head dive coach 
 Phil Laak (born 1972), Irish-American poker player

Ter Laak
 Everard Ter Laak (1868-1931), Dutch Roman Catholic missionary and bishop in China
 Ine ter Laak-Spijk (1931–2002), Dutch short and middle-distance runner
 Jens ter Laak, German figure skater

Van de Laak
 Koen van de Laak (born 1982), Dutch footballer

Van Laak
Claudia van Laak (born 1963), German radio journalist

Places
Laak, Compostela Valley, Philippines
Laak, Davao de Oro, Philippines
Laak, The Hague, Netherland
Laak River, Rotselaar, Belgium
Laak (Königsberg) formerly Germany, presently part of Kaliningrad, Russia

See also
LAK (disambiguation) / Lak